Mizell may refer to:

Surname
Beth Mizell, (born 1952), businesswoman from Franklinton, Louisiana, member of the Louisiana State Senate
Cameron Mizell (born 1983), American record producer, owner of Chango Studios in Lake Mary, Florida and Phoenix, Arizona
Cody Mizell (born 1991), American soccer player
Hank Mizell (1923–1992), American singer, guitarist and songwriter
Jason Mizell (1965–2002), American musician and DJ known by his stage name Jam Master Jay, of Run-DMC
Von Delany Mizell, the second black physician in Fort Lauderdale, Florida
Warner Mizell (1907–1971), American football player
Wilmer Mizell (1930–1999), American left-handed baseball pitcher and U.S. congressman
Zac Mizell, American rugby union player for the Ohio Aviators in PRO Rugby
Mizell Brothers, record producing team in the 1970s, consisting of Larry and Alphonso "Fonce" Mizell

Given name
Mizell Wilson (1897–1968), lieutenant and lawyer, the son of Felix Zollicoffer Wilson

Other
Barber-Mizell feud in Brevard and Orange counties, Florida in 1870 resulting in 41 deaths
Mizell-Leu House Historic District, Leu Botanical Gardens and Leu House Museum in Orlando, Florida, United States

See also
Mariazell
Mize (disambiguation)
Zell (disambiguation)